New England Telephone was the commonly used name used of a  US telecommunications company that primarily served New England from 1883 to 2000 and whose service area is split, as of 2021, between Verizon New England, where details of the corporate history can be found, and Consolidated Communications. Its formal name was New England Telephone and Telegraph Co.

New England Telephone may also refer to the following companies:
New England Telephone and Telegraph Company, which operated from 1878 to 1879, and which is unrelated to the later firm of the same name.
Consolidated Communications of Northern New England, a company founded in 2007 that operates former New England Telephone lines in Maine and New Hampshire
Consolidated Communications of Vermont, a company created in 2008 that operates former New England Telephone lines in Vermont